Marinko Prga (born 1 January 1971) is a Croatian actor. He appeared in more than fifty films since 1995.

Selected filmography

References

External links 

1971 births
Living people
Actors from Split, Croatia
Croatian male film actors
Croatian male voice actors